Angus Wagner (born 30 October 1997 in Australia) is an Australian rugby union player who plays for Western Force in Super Rugby. His playing position is prop. He was announced as a replacement signing in May 2019.

Reference list

External links
Rugby.com.au profile
itsrugby.co.uk profile

1997 births
Australian rugby union players
Living people
Rugby union props
Canberra Vikings players
ACT Brumbies players
Western Force players
Rugby union players from Queensland